Michael is a surname. Notable people with the surname include:

 Alan Michael (born 1967), Scottish artist
 Ali Michael (born 1990), American fashion model
 Alun Michael (born 1943), British politician
 Andrew Michael (entrepreneur) (born 1980), British entrepreneur
 Arky Michael, Australian actor and writer
 Asot Michael, Antigua and Barbuda politician
 Barry Michael (born 1955), Australian boxer
 Bill Michael (born 1935), American football coach
 Bill Michael (footballer) (1874–?), Scottish footballer
 Blake Michael (born 1996), American actor
 Charles W. Michael (died 1915), American politician
 Christine Michael (born 1990), American football player
 Christopher Michael, American actor
 Chrysis Michael (born 1977), Cypriot footballer
 Clem Michael (born 1976), Australian rules footballer
 Con Michael (born 1953), Australian cricketer
 Danny Michael, American audio engineer
 Ernest Michael (1925–2013), American mathematician
 Gene Michael (born 1938), American baseball player, manager and executive
 George Michael (disambiguation), multiple people
 George Michael (1963–2016), English musician, singer-songwriter and record producer
 Gertrude Michael 1911 – 1964), American actress. 
 Glen Michael (born 1926), English television presenter and radio personality
 Gregory Michael (born 1981), American actor
 Harold Michael (born 1943), American politician
 Harry Michael (born 1992), Australian rapper and songwriter, known professionally as Masked Wolf
 Holger Michael (born 1954), German diplomat
 Ib Michael (born 1945), Danish novelist and poet
 Jack Michael, American psychologist
 James Michael (born 1968), American singer, musician and record producer
 Jere Michael (born 1977), American figure skater
 John Michael (disambiguation), multiple people
 Jonathan Michael, British civil servant
 Jörg Michael (born 1963), German drummer
 Judith Michael, American writer
 Juliet Raphael Michael, South Sudanese politician
 Junior Michael (born 1971), Samoan footballer
 Kamran Michael, Pakistani politician
 Kate Michael (born 1982), American beauty pageant winner
 Keith Michael (born 1972), American fashion designer
 Ken Michael (born 1938), Australian politician
 Kevin Michael (born 1985), American musician
 Levi Michael (born 1991), American baseball player
 Livi Michael (born 1960), English writer
 Lorraine Michael (born 1943), Canadian politician
 Magali Cornier Michael, American literary critic
 Maggie Michael (born 1974), American painter
 Mal Michael (born 1977), Australian rules footballer
 Marcos Michael (born 1991), Cypriot footballer
 Michael Michael (born 1957), English criminal
 Michalis Michael (born 1987), Cypriot footballer
 Mick Michael (1922–2016), Australian politician
 Molly Michael, Oval Office operations coordinator	
 Nadja Michael (born 1969), German opera singer
 Nancy Michael, American politician
 Natasha Michael, South African politician
 Peter Michael (disambiguation), multiple people
 Philip Michael, English actor
 Riad Michael, German musician and music producer
 Rich Michael (born 1938), American football player
 Robert Michael (footballer) (1879–1963), Australian rules footballer
 Robert Eric Michael (born 1977), American artist
 Rod Michael (born 1985), American singer
 Roger Michael, British nightlife consultant
 Rudolf Michael (1890-1980), German journalist and politician (DVP)
 Sam Michael (born 1971), Australian Formula One sporting director
 Sami Michael (born 1926), Israeli writer
 Sarah Michael (born 1990), Nigerian footballer
 Sean Cameron Michael (born 1969), South African actor, writer and singer
 Stephen Michael (born 1956), Australian rules footballer
 Wijdan Michael, Iraqi politician
 Yegizaw Michael, Eritrean artist

See also
Michael, given name
List of people with given name Michael
Michaels (surname)
Surnames from given names